Saipin Datsaeng (born ) is a Thai weightlifter, competing in the 63 kg category and representing Thailand at international competitions. Among her achievements is a fourth place at the 2000 Summer Olympics in Sydney. She competed at world championships, most recently at the 2005 World Weightlifting Championships.

Major results

References

1977 births
Living people
Saipin Detsaeng
Saipin Detsaeng
Weightlifters at the 2000 Summer Olympics
Weightlifters at the 2002 Asian Games
Weightlifters at the 1998 Asian Games
Saipin Detsaeng
Southeast Asian Games medalists in weightlifting
Competitors at the 2001 Southeast Asian Games
Saipin Detsaeng
Saipin Detsaeng
Saipin Detsaeng